St Thomas' Church is in Royal Lane, Eaton, Cheshire, England.  It is an active Anglican parish church in the deanery of Malpas, the archdeaconry of Chester, and the diocese of Chester.  Its benefice is united with those of St Helen, Tarporley, St John and Holy Cross, Cotebrook, and St Paul Utkinton.  It is a small brick church built in 1896, with lancet windows, a west porch, and a timber bellcote.  In 1936 the Lancaster architect Henry Paley of Austin and Paley refitted the church with a new marble floor to the sanctuary, reredos, pulpit, stalls, chancel screen, and with the creation of an organ chamber.

See also

List of ecclesiastical works by Austin and Paley (1916–44)

References

External links
Church website

Church of England church buildings in Cheshire
19th-century Church of England church buildings
Gothic Revival church buildings in England
Gothic Revival architecture in Cheshire
Austin and Paley buildings
Diocese of Chester